Glycyphana horsfieldi, is a species of flower chafer found in India, Sri Lanka, Malaysia, Thailand, Nepal, and Vietnam.

Description
The average length of the adult beetle is about 2.7 cm. It has been observed from guava plantations. Grubs generally feed on rotten wood of Bombax insigne, Chloroxylon swietenia and Samanea saman.

There is a slight variation in beetles found from Indian subregion with Sri Lanka. The form in Himalayan region is small and narrow with small golden triangular elytral patches. Whereas the Sri Lankan form is usually larger and broader with the large golden elytral patches. Third instar has a cylindrical, dull whitish body. Average length of the third instar is about length 13 mm, with a 3mm width head capsule. Spiracles distinct, with a ‘C’ shaped yellowish brown cranium. Antenna has four antennomeres.

Subspecies
Three subspecies recognized.

 Glycyphana horsfieldi aurulenta Arrow, 1910
 Glycyphana horsfieldi horsfieldi Hope, 1831
 Glycyphana horsfieldi sylhetica Miksic, 1970

Gallery

References 

Cetoniinae
Insects of Sri Lanka
Insects of India
Insects described in 1831